Aleksey Sergeevich Nepomniaschiy is Russian and Ukrainian journalist, main editor of daily business newspaper Capital.

See also 
 Capital (Ukrainian newspaper)

References

Russian journalists
Ukrainian journalists